Gay Gordons is a patience game played with a single deck of playing cards. Gay Gordons is also known under its alternative name Exit, and was invented by David Parlett.

Rules
It is played with a standard deck of playing cards, with jokers removed. A layout of ten piles of five cards each is dealt face up, with two reserve cards also face up. 

The top card of each pile and of the reserve is in play, and the piles cannot be refilled or built on. Empty piles cannot be refilled. 

The aim of the game is to remove all cards by making pairs that add up to eleven (suits are not important). Kings pair with queens of a non-matching suit, jacks with other jacks, and aces with tens.

Variants

The game is popularly implemented as described with 10 tableau piles of five cards each, and Parlett's own instructions refer to "ten columns".  However the image on Parlett's site depicts only five tableau piles of ten cards each, which is an alternative and much more difficult way to play.

References

See also
 List of patience or solitaire games
 Glossary of patience or solitaire terms

Open non-builders
Single-deck patience card games
Year of introduction missing